Adam Brace (born 1980, London, England) is a British playwright and director. Brace is the resident associate dramaturg of Soho Theatre in London.  His play Stovepipe, performed in promenade, premiered at the HighTide festival in Suffolk before transferring to London for an eight-week run in collaboration with the National Theatre. The play is about corporate soldiers and Brace wrote it after a tour of Jordan where he conducted interviews with men in that job. The play was critically acclaimed, receiving numerous five star reviews and being called "rivetingly intelligent" by the Sunday Times and "exhilaratingly convincing' by The Independent. The play was named at number 10 in The Times Top Twenty Plays of the Decade.

He has also written a play called A Real Humane Person Who Cares And All That, which was performed in Edinburgh in 2008, before transferring to the Arcola in London.

Brace is currently directing One Woman Show at the Ambassadors Theatre, London. This show previously played at Soho Theatre in 2021.

References

1980 births
Living people
Theatre people from London
British dramatists and playwrights
British male dramatists and playwrights